The Zone of Interest is the fourteenth novel by the English author Martin Amis, published in 2014. Set in Auschwitz, it tells the story of a Nazi officer who has become enamored with the camp commandant's wife. The story is conveyed by three narrators: Angelus Thomsen, the officer; Paul Doll, the commandant; and Szmul Zacharias, a Jewish Sonderkommando.

Plot summary 
The novel begins in August 1942, with Thomsen's first sight of Hannah Doll, wife of Paul Doll, the camp's commandant. (Doll's name is similar to Otto Moll, a notorious camp commandant in real life.) He is immediately intrigued and initiates a few encounters with her. In time their relationship becomes more intimate, even though it remains unfulfilled. Despite their attempts at discretion, Paul Doll's suspicions are raised. He has her followed by one of the camp's prisoners, and is informed by him that they did indeed make two exchanges of letters.   While spying on Hannah in the bathroom (as he does regularly), Paul watches her read the letter from Thomsen secretly and rather excitedly, before destroying it. From that point onward, his wife becomes increasingly contemptuous of him, viciously taunting him in private, and embarrassing him in public. Paul decides to assign Szmul, a long-serving member of the Sonderkommando, to the murder of his wife. He does so by threatening to capture Szmul's wife, Shulamith. The murder is scheduled to take place on April 30, 1943 - at Walpurgisnacht.

The narrative then skips a few years, to the story's aftermath. In September 1948, Thomsen attempts to find Hannah, who has disappeared. He finds her at Rosenheim, where she met her husband. He is told what happened at Walpurgisnacht: at the moment Szmul was supposed to murder Hannah, he instead pointed the weapon on himself, and revealed the truth to her. Paul Doll then shot him before he could commit suicide. Thomsen asks Hannah if they could still meet each other. She tells him that while in the concentration camp he was to her a figure for what was sane and decent, outside the camp he simply reminded her of her past life's insanity. Despondently, he withdraws and leaves her.

Structure and themes 
The novel is divided into six chapters and an epilogue. Each of the six chapters is divided into three sections: the first is narrated by Thomsen, the second by Paul Doll, and the third by Szmul. The epilogue, named Aftermath, is also divided into three sections, all of them narrated by Thomsen, and each devoted to a different woman: first Esther, then Gerda Bormann, and finally Hannah Doll.

The styles and manners of the three narrators vary widely. Thomsen is the protagonist of the novel, mostly indifferent to the camp's crimes until his falling in love with Hannah Doll. His narration is the most reasonable of the three. Paul Doll's style is more eccentric and delusional than Thomsen's. He is zealously devoted to the Nazi effort of genocide, and shows a terrifying apathy to the horrors of the concentration camp. His growing instability is magnified when, during his ruminations, he insists that he is a perfectly normal man, acting as any other man would. As the German defeat becomes imminent and affects the morale of everyone around him, Doll makes an absurdly detached evaluation of the war's aftermath. Out of the three, Szmul is the most obscure, and his narration serves as a small epilogue for each chapter. His tone is sepulchral, and most of his thoughts consist of incredulous reflection on his actions.

Reception 
Reviews were largely positive, with some naming it Amis' best novel in 25 years, since the much acclaimed London Fields. Joyce Carol Oates, writing for The New Yorker, described the novel as "a compendium of epiphanies, appalled asides, anecdotes, and radically condensed history", with Amis "at his most compelling as a satiric vivisectionist with a cool eye and an unwavering scalpel". A reviewer in The Washington Post gave praise for Amis' singular talent for words, and praised character Paul Doll's narration as "a masterful comic performance".

Criticism of the book mentioned its anticlimactic plot, and its overt misplaced eroticism.

Awards and honours
2015 Walter Scott Prize, shortlist

References

External links 
 Martin Amis on Charlie Rose discussing The Zone of Interest
 Vintage Podcast: Ian McEwan & Martin Amis in Conversation
 Lateline - An extended version of Martin Amis interview
 Martin Amis interview for BBC 3

2014 British novels
Novels by Martin Amis
Auschwitz concentration camp
Novels set in Poland
Novels about the Holocaust
Jonathan Cape books